Yngvar Fredriksen (26 March 1887 – 25 December 1957) was a Norwegian gymnast who competed in the 1906 Summer Olympics.

In 1906 he won the gold medal as member of the Norwegian gymnastics team in the team competition.

External links
Yngvar Fredriksen's profile at databaseOlympics
Yngvar Fredriksen's profile at Sports Reference.com

1887 births
1957 deaths
Norwegian male artistic gymnasts
Olympic gymnasts of Norway
Gymnasts at the 1906 Intercalated Games
Olympic gold medalists for Norway

Medalists at the 1906 Intercalated Games
20th-century Norwegian people